Simon Gaunt  (1959-2021) was a professor of French literature at King's College London, where he was Head of the French Department and Head of the School of Humanities.  He was past president of the Society for French Studies (2006-8), a Fellow of King's College, London from 2015 and an Honorary Fellow of St. Catharine's College, Cambridge from 2016.

Gaunt did his graduate studies at the University of Warwick and then taught at the University of Cambridge before moving to King's College to take up an established chair in 1998.

In July 2018 Gaunt was elected Fellow of the British Academy (FBA).

He died of complications from treatment for myeloma in December, 2021.

Publications
Marco Polo's 'Le Devisement du Monde'. Narrative Voice, Language and Diversity Gallica, Vol. 31 (D.S. Brewer, 2013)
 Martyrs to Love: Love and Death in Medieval French and Occitan Courtly Literature (Oxford: OUP, 2006)
 Gender and Genre in Medieval French Literature (Cambridge: Cambridge University Press, 1995; pbk 2005)
 Retelling the Tale: an Introduction to Medieval French Literature (London: Duckworth, 2001)
 (with Ruth Harvey and Linda Paterson) Marcabru: a Critical Edition (Cambridge: D.S. Brewer, 2000)
 (with Sarah Kay) The Troubadours: an Introduction (Cambridge: Cambridge University Press, 1999)
 Troubadours and Irony (Cambridge: Cambridge University Press, 1989)

References

External links
 Gaunt's profile at King's College London

Academics of King's College London
English literary critics
Literary critics of French
Alumni of the University of Warwick
Academics of the University of Cambridge
Fellows of the British Academy
Fellows of King's College London
Fellows of St Catharine's College, Cambridge
Deaths from multiple myeloma